In enzymology, a dimethylhistidine N-methyltransferase is an enzyme that catalyzes the chemical reaction

S-adenosyl-L-methionine + Nalpha,Nalpha-dimethyl-L-histidine  S-adenosyl-L-homocysteine + Nalpha,Nalpha,Nalpha-trimethyl-L-histidine

Thus, the two substrates of this enzyme are S-adenosyl methionine and Nalpha,Nalpha-dimethyl-L-histidine, whereas its two products are S-adenosylhomocysteine and Nalpha,Nalpha,Nalpha-trimethyl-L-histidine.

This enzyme belongs to the family of transferases, specifically those transferring one-carbon group methyltransferases.  The systematic name of this enzyme class is S-adenosyl-L-methionine:Nalpha,Nalpha-dimethyl-L-histidine Nalpha-methyltransferase. Other names in common use include dimethylhistidine methyltransferase, histidine-alpha-N-methyltransferase, S-adenosyl-L-methionine:alpha-N,alpha-N-dimethyl-L-histidine, and alpha-N-methyltransferase.

References

 

EC 2.1.1
Enzymes of unknown structure